Saran district of Bihar, India is divided into 3 sub-divisions, 20 Blocks and has a total of 1,764 villages. There are 194 uninhabited villages (out of 1,764 total villages) in the district of Saran.

This is list of villages of Saran district according to respective blocks.

Amnour 

 Admapur
 Amnaur Aguan
 Amnaur Aguwan
 Amnaur Harnaraen
 Amnaur Kalean
 Amnaur Sultan
 Apahar
 Arazi Dharampur
 Arna
 Bagahi
 Balaha
 Baldiha
 Bande
 Bans Dih
 Basatpur
 Basauta
 Basauti
 Bedauliya
 Bhagwatpur
 Bhatehri
 Bhatha
 Bhusna
 Bishamhar Chhapra
 Bishunpur
 Bishunpura
 Chainpur
 Chainpur
 Chak Arna
 Chak Man
 Chandpura
 Chhapra Abhiman
 Daur Chhapra
 Dharahra Khurd
 Dharahra kalan
 Dharampur Jafar
 Dhorhlahi Abhiman
 Dhorhlahi Kaithal
 Dumaria
 Firozpur
 Ganaura
 Gangapur
 Garaul
 Gasa Khap
 Gawandri
 Gawandri
 Gheyaspur
 Gochhi Chhapra
 Guna Chhapra
 Hakma
 Harpur
 Hela
 Husepur
 Jafarpur
 Jalalpur
 Jhakhra
 Jhaua Patti
 Jogini
 Kairganwan
 Kaithaulia
 Kasimpur
 Katsa
 Kewari Kalan
 Khas Patti
 Khori Pakar Badla
 Khori pakar Kharag
 Kishunpur
 Kohripak Gobind
 Korea
 Kuari
 Lakhna
 Madarpur
 Madhubani
 Maksudpur
 Maksudpur
 Malahi
 Manorpur Jhakhari
 Manpur
 Munra
 Narsingh Bhanpur
 Narsingh Patti
 Nauranga
 Nawada
 Paharpur
 Paiga Kalan
 Paiga Mitarsen
 Paiga Sadar
 Pakri
 Pakri Mahammad
 Panre Tola
 Parasrampur
 Parmanand Chhapra
 Parsa
 Patrahi Kalan
 Patrahi Khurd
 Rahimpur
 Rahimpur Karan
 Rajupur
 Ram Chak
 Rasulpur
 Repura
 Sahadi Chhapra
 Salkhua
 Sandalpur
 Saray Bakhsh
 Shahpur
 Shekhpura
 Shekhpura
 Shekhpura
 Shikarpur
 Sirsia Bali
 Sirsia Jagdeo
 Sirsia Khap
 Sirsia Mani
 Sirsia Rai
 Sonaha
 Takia
 Tarwar
 Umarpur

Baniapur 

 Agrauli
 Amanw
 Amanw Khurd
 Anandpur
 Andhar Ajor
 Banakar
 Bangalipatti
 Baniapur
 Banropur
 Basatpur
 Batrauli
 Bedauli
 Bengali Bhithi
 Berui
 Bhagwanpur
 Bhaiya Ramki Dhauri
 Bhakura
 Bhatwalia
 Bhithi
 Bhithi Bazar
 Bhuidhara
 Bhusanw
 Bindra Patak
 Chak pir
 Chandpur
 Chandpur Birt
 Chhapia
 Chhapia
 Chhatwa Khurd
 Chhatwan Kalan
 Chhitauni
 Chorauan
 Darhibarhi
 Darhibarhi
 Dewalkha
 Dhanawn
 Dhanawn
 Dhangaraha
 Dhobwal
 Dungurpatti
 Goapipar Panti
 Hafizpur
 Hansrajpur Kalan
 Hansrajpur Kalan Birti
 Hansrajpur Khurd
 Harakhpura
 Hardew Tola
 Hardi Tola
 Hariharpur
 Harpur
 Harpur
 Hunraraha Kalan
 Hunraraha Khurd
 Ibrahimpur
 Jahangirpur
 Kalhua
 Kamta
 Kanhauli Manohar
 Kanhauli Sangram
 Kanth Chhapra
 Karah
 Karahi
 Katsa
 Khabsa
 Khabsi
 Khalispur
 Lauwa Kalan
 Lutha Dhananw
 Machhagra
 Majhaulia
 Majhaulia Kalan
 Majhaulia Khurd
 Manikpura
 Manopali
 Maricha
 Menruka
 Menruka
 Menruka
 Milkipur
 Mirzapur
 Muslimpur
 Nadauan
 Nagdiha
 Najiba
 Nandlal Tola
 Pachmahla
 Paighambarpur
 Panrepur
 Paterhia
 Piarepur
 Pindra
 Pindra
 Pipra
 Pirari
 Pirauta Khas Ghurahu
 Pirauta Megha
 Pithauri
 Rajauli
 Repura
 Sarea
 Sarea
 Sarmi
 Satua
 Shekhpura
 Shekhpura
 Sihoria
 Siripur
 Siripur
 Sisai
 Suhai Gajan
 Suhai Sahpur
 Suraudha
 Tola Tawakal Rai
 Usti

Chapra 

 Amar Chhapra
 Badalpura
 Badalpura Diara
 Badlutola
 Bahoran Tola
 Balgarha
 Balua
 Banathi
 Bangra
 Barhampur
 Barhara Mahazi
 Basarhi
 Batani
 Bazidpur
 Bhairopur Aima
 Bhairopur Nizamat
 Bichla Telpa
 Bichli Badhar
 Bishunpura
 Chak Haji
 Chak Jamali
 Chakia
 Chan Chaura
 Chhuri Chhapra
 Chirand
 Daftarpur
 Dahiawan
 Dariyawganj
 Dhanpat Chhapra
 Dharampura
 Dhusaria
 Diara Singahi
 Dumaria
 Dumri
 Ekauna
 Gheghta
 Gopalpur
 Harnarayan Chhapra
 Hasanpurwa
 Ismailpur
 Itahia
 Jagdishpur
 Jalalpur
 Jalalpur
 Jamuna
 Jatia Bajidpur
 Jatua
 Kans Diar
 Karinga
 Khalpura Bala
 Khalpura Kamala
 Khawaspur
 Khawaspur Khurd
 Kotwapatti Rampur
 Lodipur
 Lodipur Diara
 Lohra
 Lohri
 Madanipatti
 Mahaji Dharhara
 Mahaji Khalpura Bala
 Mahaji Khalpura Kamala
 Maharajganj
 Makhdumganj
 Mala Mirja Tukra II
 Malamirza Tukra
 Malasherpur
 Mangaidih
 Manupur Jahangir
 Manupur Manjhan
 Marahia
 Mauna
 Mehian
 Mehrauli
 Methwalia
 Mira Musehri
 Misraulia
 Mohaddipur
 Musehri
 Musehri Mahto
 Musepur
 Naini
 Nandlal Chhapra
 Narayanpur
 Nauadih
 Panapur
 Parsotim Chhapra
 Phakuli
 Phul Chak
 Purbari Telpa
 Qazipur
 Raipur Bingawan
 Rajaiya Tola
 Ram Kolwa
 Rasalpura
 Ratanpura
 Semaria Mahazi
 Shankarpur Urf Kutubpur
 Sherpur
 Shukulpura
 Sidhwalia
 Singahi
 Siram Chak
 Sujan Chhapra
 Taufir Maharajganj
 Tejpurwa
 Tenua
 Todarpur
 Turkaulia

Dariapur 

 Admapur
 Akbarpur I
 Akbarpur II
 Aqilpur
 Bajahia
 Bajaraha
 Bali Chhapra
 Baluahia
 Banwaripur
 Banwaripur
 Banwaripur
 Barka Banea
 Barua
 Barwa
 Bedaulia
 Bela
 Belahar Janki
 Belahar Pattu
 Bhagwan Chak
 Bhagwanpur
 Bhagwanpur
 Bhagwanpur
 Bhairopur
 Bhaw Chak
 Bhetwalia
 Bhopan Chak
 Bisahi
 Bisamharpur
 Chak Akbarpur
 Chak Banwaripur
 Chak Han
 Chak Hasan
 Chak Jalal
 Chak Khanpur Mahartha
 Chak Nagwa Khurd Mahartha
 Chak Ruddi
 Chak Semrahiya Mahartha
 Chandwa Chak
 Chaubhaia
 Chhotami
 Chhotka Banea
 Daluwa Chak
 Darihara Bhual
 Darihara Chaturbhuj
 Darihara Nisakh
 Dariyapur
 Darwesha
 Derni
 Dewti
 Dhanauti Sultanpur
 DhanneChapra
 Dhanuki
 Dharam Chak
 Dhongaha Fatuh
 Dhongaha Inam
 Diara Mahazi
 Dumaria
 Dumaria Sani
 Edilpur
 Faqir Chak
 Fatehpur Chain
 Fursatpur
 Fursatpur
 Garauna
 Gariba Chak
 Gay Ghat
 Ghurhu Kothia
 Gopalpur
 Hakar Patti
 Hardia Chak
 Hariharpur
 Hariharpur
 Harna
 Harpur
 Hewantpur
 Hingua
 Hukraha
 Hukrahi
 Ibrahimpur
 Inglish
 Itwa
 Jadopur
 Jadurampur
 Jaduwa Chak
 Jagdish
 Jagdishpur
 Jaitipur
 Jalalpur
 Jamira
 Jitwarpur
 Joga Chak
 Kakarahat
 Kamalpur
 Karam Chak
 Karanpura
 Kewatia
 Khajauta
 Khajuhta
 Khanpur
 Khirkia
 Khojauli
 Khushihal pur
 Kishun Das
 Koila
 Konhwa
 Kothia
 Kothia
 Kusiari
 Kuwari
 Lachhmanpur
 Litiahi
 Lohchha
 Lohchha- Kapurtal
 Mahammadpur
 Mahammadpur
 Mahesia
 Mahesia
 Malahi Chak
 Malmala
 Manchitwa
 Mangarpal Murtuza
 Mangarpal Nuran
 Manika Chak
 Manoharpur
 Manpur
 Manpur
 Mansa Chak
 Manupur
 Masti Chak
 Math Balgobinda
 Math Kakara
 Math Kewatia
 Mathchelwa
 Mohan Chak
 Mohan Kothia
 Mujauna
 Mujauna Mahartha
 Murar chak
 Nagwa
 Naso Chak
 Natha Chhapra
 Nawada
 Nonphar
 Panch Bhaia
 Parsurampur
 Partappur
 Patti Sital
 Piara Math
 Pipra
 Pirari
 Pirari
 Pitu Chak
 Pojhi
 Porai
 Purdilpur
 Purnadih
 Rahimapur
 Rajapur
 Ramjitpur
 Rampur
 Rampur
 Rampur Aanant
 Rampur Jagdish
 Ranipur
 Rasulpur
 Sadwara
 Sahay Chak
 Saidpur
 Sajnupur Mathihan
 Sakhnauli
 Salempur
 Salempur
 Saman Chak
 Samaspura
 Sanjha
 Sarae Muzaffar
 Sarae Saho
 Saraia
 Sarari
 Sarnarayan
 Sarnath Chak
 Semrahia
 Shahar Chhapra
 Sikandara
 Sisauni
 Sitalpur Chak Mahartha
 Sultanpur
 Sumerpatti
 Sundarpur
 Sutihar
 Tapsia
 Tinbhaia
 Turki
 Ubhwa
 Yar Mohammadpur
 Zaminpur

Dighwara 

 Ahiman Patti
 Akilpur
 Ami
 Anu CHak
 Babhangawan
 Baguraha
 Baqarpur
 Barua
 Basti Jalal
 Batrauli
 Bishunpur
 Bishunpur Mohan
 Bodha Chhapra
 Chatra
 Dharipur
 Dudhia
 Fakuli
 Goraipur
 Haraji
 Ismaila
 Jaitipur
 Jhaua
 Kakaria
 Kanakpur
 Kesarpur
 Kuraia
 Malkha Chak
 Manupur
 Mathurapur
 Milki
 Nizama Chak
 Pakaulia
 Pakauliya
 Parsotimpur
 Parsotimpur
 Pharhada
 Pipra Salehpur
 Ramdas Chak
 Rampur Ami
 Salhadi
 Sitalpur
 Sobarna
 Tilok Chak
 Una Chak
 Yusufpur
 Yusufpur

Ekma 

 Amdarhi
 Asahni
 Atarsan
 Athdila
 Bahuwara
 Bal
 Baliya
 Banpura
 Banpura
 Bansi Chhapra
 Banwari Amnaur
 Basantpur
 Be. Chhapri
 Bedupur
 Benaut
 Betuania (Batbaniya)
 Bharhopur
 Bhodsa
 Bishunpura Kalan
 Bishunpura Khurd
 Chak Islam
 Chak Mira
 Chan Chaura
 Chanrwa(Chandchaura)
 Chapraitha
 Chapraithi
 Chhapia
 Chhitraulia
 Dewpura
 Dhana Dih
 Dhana Dih
 Dhanauti
 Dohar
 Ekari
 Ekma
 Eksar
 Galimanpur
 Gangwa
 Gauspur
 Ghaziapur
 Hakam
 Hansrajpur
 Hanumanganj
 Harpur
 Husepur
 Ithari
 Jamanpura
 Jamni Amnaur
 Jogia
 Karanpura
 Khajuhan
 Kosari
 Laguni
 Lakat Chhapra
 Lalpur Mathia
 Langra
 Lauwari
 Madhopur
 Makundpur
 Mani
 Mani Chhapra
 Manikpur
 Mathia
 Nagra
 Nagra Basantpur
 Nautan
 Nawada
 Pachua
 Panre Chhapra
 Panre ke Bhuin
 Parsa
 Phuchti Kalan
 Phuchti Khurd
 Rajapur
 Rampur
 Rampur
 Rasulpur
 Rith
 Safari
 Sasna
 Senduar
 Siuri
 Siuri
 Sobhan Chhapra
 Soraunu
 Tarwania
 Telia Dih
 Tesuar
 Tiwari Chhapra
 Tola Doman Rai
 Tola Madhopur
 Tola Rampur
 Tola Ranglal

References

Saran district
Saran district